Joost Van Nuyse House, also known as the Ditmas Coe House, is a historic home located in Flatlands, Brooklyn, New York, New York. The original section was built in 1744 and enlarged between 1793 and 1806.  It was moved to its present site in 1925.  It is a -story frame house with a steeply pitched flared roof.

It was listed on the National Register of Historic Places in 2006.

A report in 2020 added that this structure, now a private residence, is an "example of the Dutch Colonial farmhouse, and it is sometimes called the Ditmas Coe House or the Van Nuyse-Coe house, named after both the man suspected to have built the dwelling, Joost Van Nuyse, and Ditmas Coe, who rented the home in 1852".

References

Flatlands, Brooklyn
Houses on the National Register of Historic Places in Brooklyn
Colonial architecture in New York (state)
Houses completed in 1744
1744 establishments in the Thirteen Colonies